Ambesa laetella is a species of snout moth. It is found in North America.

References

Moths described in 1880
Pyralinae
Moths of North America